Lullington is a village and civil parish just across the Mells River from Beckington and  north east of Frome, in the Mendip district of Somerset, England.

The parish includes the hamlet of Laverton, where the Church of St Mary dates from the 11th century.

History

The name Lullington means the settlement of Lulla's people.

Before the Norman Conquest the estate belonged to King Harold, later passing to Longleat Priory and after the Dissolution of the Monasteries was acquired by the Thynne family. It was sold in the early 19th century by the Marquess of Bath and bought by William Duckworth, who rebuilt the village.

The parish was part of the hundred of Frome.

Just to the south of the village is the Orchardleigh Estate, which comprises a Victorian stately home, built in 1856 by Thomas Henry Wyatt for William Duckworth, a 13th-century island church, and an 18-hole golf course.

Governance

The parish council has responsibility for local issues, including setting an annual precept (local rate) to cover the council's operating costs and producing annual accounts for public scrutiny. The parish council evaluates local planning applications and works with the local police, district council officers and neighbourhood watch groups on matters of crime, security and traffic. The parish council's role also includes initiating projects for the maintenance and repair of parish facilities, as well as consulting with the district council on the maintenance, repair and improvement of highways, drainage, footpaths, public transport and street cleaning. Conservation matters (including trees and listed buildings) and environmental issues are also the responsibility of the council.

The village falls within the Non-metropolitan district of Mendip, which was formed on 1 April 1974 under the Local Government Act 1972, having previously been part of Frome Rural District, which is responsible for local planning and building control, local roads, council housing, environmental health, markets and fairs, refuse collection and recycling, cemeteries and crematoria, leisure services, parks and tourism.

Somerset County Council is responsible for running the largest and most expensive local services such as education, social services, libraries, main roads, public transport, policing and fire services, trading standards, waste disposal and strategic planning.

It is also part of the Somerton and Frome county constituency represented in the House of Commons of the Parliament of the United Kingdom. It elects one Member of Parliament (MP) by the first past the post system of election.

Religious sites

The parish Church of All Saints dates from the 12th century, the south aisle from around 1280, and the chancel, tower and south porch circa 1450. The church was restored in 1862 by T.H. Wyatt. It is a Grade I listed building. Henry Waldegrave, 11th Earl Waldegrave was the rector of the village in the early 20th century.

References

Villages in Mendip District
Civil parishes in Somerset